The men's individual recurve competition at the 2021 World Archery Championships took place from 21 to 26 September in Yankton, United States.

Schedule
All times are Central Daylight Time (UTC−05:00).

Qualification round
Results after 72 arrows.

Elimination round
Source:

Section 1

Section 2

Section 3

Section 4

Section 5

Section 6

Section 7

Section 8

Final round

Source:

References

2021 World Archery Championships